The 2014 Southern Conference women's basketball tournament took place between March 7 and 10 in Asheville, North Carolina, at the U.S. Cellular Center. The quarterfinals will be streamed on ESPN3 while the semifinals and finals will be shown on CSS and streamed on ESPN3. The champion receives an automatic bid into the 2014 NCAA tournament.

Bracket

References

External links
 SoCon Basketball Championship

Tournament
SoCon women's
College basketball tournaments in North Carolina
Southern Conference women's basketball tournament
Southern Conference women's basketball tournament
Southern Conference women's basketball tournament
Women's sports in North Carolina